Dimethylaniline monooxygenase [N-oxide-forming] 1 is an enzyme that in humans is encoded by the FMO1 gene.

Metabolic N-oxidation of the diet-derived amino-trimethylamine (TMA) is mediated by flavin-containing monooxygenase and is subject to an inherited FMO3 polymorphism in humans resulting in a small subpopulation with reduced TMA N-oxidation capacity resulting in fish odor syndrome Trimethylaminuria. Three forms of the enzyme, FMO1 found in fetal liver, FMO2 found in adult liver, and FMO3 are encoded by genes clustered in the 1q23-q25 region.   Flavin-containing monooxygenases are NADPH-dependent flavoenzymes that catalyzes the oxidation of soft nucleophilic heteroatom centers in xenobiotics such as pesticides and drugs.

References

Further reading